Heinemann may refer to:

 Heinemann (surname)
 Heinemann (publisher), a publishing company
 Heinemann Park, a.k.a. Pelican Stadium in New Orleans, Louisiana, United States

See also
 Heineman
 Jamie Hyneman